The Anglo-Turkish War of 1807–1809, part of the Napoleonic Wars, was fought between the United Kingdom and the Ottoman Empire.

Ultimatum
In the summer of 1806, during the War of the Third Coalition (of Great Britain, Russia, Austria, Sweden), Napoleon's ambassador General Count Sebastiani managed to convince the Porte to cancel all special privileges granted to Russia in 1805 and to open the Ottoman straits (the Dardanelles) exclusively to French warships. In return, Napoleon promised to help the Sultan suppress the rebellion in Serbia and to recover lost territories. When the Russian army marched into Moldavia and Wallachia in 1806, the Ottomans declared war on Russia.

Dardanelles operation

In September 1806, the British government pressured Sultan Selim III to expel Sebastiani, declare war on France, cede the Danubian Principalities to Russia, and surrender the Ottoman fleet, together with the forts on the Dardanelles, to the Royal Navy. After Selim's rejection of the ultimatum, a British squadron under Vice Admiral John Thomas Duckworth entered the Dardanelles on 19 February 1807 and destroyed an Ottoman naval force in the Sea of Marmara, and anchored opposite Constantinople. With French assistance the Ottomans erected powerful batteries and strengthened their fortifications. The British warships were cannonaded suffering the loss of two ships. Duckworth made the decision to withdraw to the Mediterranean on 3 March 1807.

Alexandria expedition of 1807

On 16 March 1807, 6,000 British troops embarked for Alexandria in Ottoman Egypt, which they captured in August. Governor Muhammad Ali mounted effective counter-attacks and a lack of supplies forced the British to withdraw. The Ottoman Empire had little military support from France in the war with Russia; Napoleon failed to secure Russia's compliance with the armistice agreement of 1807 with Britain, which was now at war with both France and Russia.

Notes

External links
Ottoman Empire at the Encyclopædia Britannica

Conflicts in 1807
Conflicts in 1808
Conflicts in 1809
Ottoman 1807
Wars involving the Ottoman Empire
Napoleonic Wars
19th-century military history of the United Kingdom
1800s in the Ottoman Empire
1807 in Egypt
1800s in the British Empire
Ottoman Empire–United Kingdom relations